Li Chongjin (died 960) was a military general during imperial China's Five Dynasties and Ten Kingdoms period and the subsequent Song Dynasty. A nephew of Later Zhou's founding emperor Guo Wei, he rose to high ranks in the Later Zhou military. When Later Zhou was overthrown by Zhao Kuangyin who founded Song, Li Chongjin initially submitted to Zhao but eventually rebelled. He was defeated and committed suicide.

Notes and references

Sources
 

960 deaths
Song dynasty jiedushi of Huainan Circuit
Later Zhou jiedushi of Zhongwu Circuit
Politicians from Taiyuan
Generals from Shanxi
Political office-holders in Jiangsu
Later Zhou jiedushi of Guide Circuit
Later Zhou jiedushi of Tianping Circuit
Later Zhou jiedushi of Huainan Circuit
Song dynasty jiedushi of Pinglu Circuit
Suicides by self-immolation
Suicides in the Song dynasty
Year of birth unknown
Song dynasty politicians from Shanxi